The 66th Army was a field army of the Red Army. It was established in  August 1942 from the 8th Reserve Army. The 66th Army fought to break through to the Volga to the north of Stalingrad during September and October 1942. During Operation Uranus, the Soviet encirclement of German troops in Stalingrad, 66th Army troops linked up with those of the 62nd Army, forming the inner encirclement. Until February the army fought to destroy the pocket and then was held in reserve. In May 1943 it became the 5th Guards Army for its actions during the Battle of Stalingrad.

Commanders
Vladimir Kurdyumov (05.08.1942 -15.08.1942)
Stepan Kalinin (15.08.1942 -27.08.1942)
Rodion Malinovsky (27.08.1942 -14.10.1942)
Aleksey Semenovich Zhadov (14.10.1942 –16.04.1943)

Bibliography
Шестьдесят шестая армия // 

Military units and formations established in 1942
Field armies of the Soviet Union
Military units and formations disestablished in 1943